Muhammad Jahanzaib Khan Khichi is a Pakistani politician who was the Provincial Minister of Punjab for Transport, in office from 13 September 2018 till April 2022. He had been a member of the Provincial Assembly of the Punjab from August 2018 till January 2023.

Previously he was a Member of the Provincial Assembly of the Punjab from February 2013 to May 2018.

Early life and education
He was born on 7 January 1973 in Lahore.

He received intermediate level education.

Political career

He was elected to the Provincial Assembly of the Punjab as a candidate of Pakistan Tehreek-e-Insaf (PTI) from Constituency PP-239 (Vehari-VIII) in by-polls held in February 2013. He received 35,478 votes and defeated a candidate of Pakistan Peoples Party.

He was re-elected to the Provincial Assembly of the Punjab as a candidate of PTI from Constituency PP-239 (Vehari-VIII) in 2013 Pakistani general election.

He was re-elected to Provincial Assembly of the Punjab as a candidate of PTI from Constituency PP-236 (Vehari-VIII) in 2018 Pakistani general election.

On 12 September 2018, he was inducted into the provincial Punjab cabinet of Chief Minister Sardar Usman Buzdar. On 13 September 2018, he was appointed as Provincial Minister of Punjab for Transport.

References

Living people
Punjab MPAs 2013–2018
1973 births
Pakistan Tehreek-e-Insaf MPAs (Punjab)
Punjab MPAs 2008–2013
Punjab MPAs 2018–2023
Provincial ministers of Punjab